(Old Norse, meaning "fellowship, partnership") was a joint financial venture between partners in Viking Age society.

Etymology
The word  is constructed by the word  (cattle, wealth) and a verbal base denoting "lay", the meaning being "to lay property together."

The Old Norse word  "companion, comrade" originally meaning "one who has  with another" has resulted in the modern English word fellow from Old English , Danish  from Old Danish felge, and Norwegian .

The modern English word fellowship derives from the Old Norse  stem, adding the -ship suffix as a "condition of being", cognate with Icelandic . The word also exists in other Germanic languages; Norwegian , Danish  and Dutch .

Runic inscriptions
The term  is mentioned on a broad range of runic inscriptions, most notably in the form  (see etymology section), in these contexts meaning "comrade", "weapon brother" or "partner". Runestones that use a form of the term  include Sö 292 in Bröta, Vg 112 in Ås, Vg 122 in Abrahamstorp, the now-lost Vg 146 in Slöta, Vg 182 in Skattegården, U 391 in Villa Karlsro, the now-lost U 954 in Söderby, DR 1 in Haddeby, DR 66 and DR 68 in Århus, DR 125 in Dalbyover, DR 127 in Hobro, DR 262 in Fosie, DR 270 in Skivarp, DR 279 in Sjörup, DR 316 in Norra Nöbbelöv, DR 318 in Håstad, DR 321 in Västra Karaby, DR 329 and DR 330 in Gårdstånga, DR 339 in Stora Köpinge, and X UaFv1914;47 in Berezanj, Ukraina.

N 648
The inscription dates back to the early fourteenth century. The inscription speaks of Þórir the Fair who greets his  Hafgrímr, and requests his partner to help him in need.

See also
 Fe rune

References

Viking practices
Early Germanic law
Early Germanic economy